Rocky Island (Vietnamese: Đảo Đá) is one of the Paracel Islands in the South China Sea. It is under the administration of the People's Republic of China and guarded by the PLA Navy. The island is also claimed by Taiwan and Vietnam.

Geography
Until 2016–2017, Rocky Island was connected to Woody Island by an 800-metre concrete causeway. Land reclamation in 2016-2017 has joined the two islands by a larger area of land. The north part of causeway is now part of an infill construction project while the south end provides protection of the roadway from the sea.

History
A signals intelligence station was built on Rocky Island in 1995, mainly because the island is the highest point in the Paracel Islands.

See also
Sansha
South China Sea Islands

References

External links
Satellite image of Rocky Island by Google Maps.

Paracel Islands
Disputed territories in Asia
Territorial disputes of the Republic of China
Territorial disputes of Vietnam